Epistulae ex Ponto (Letters from the Black Sea) is a work of Ovid, in four books. It is a collection of letters describing Ovid's exile in Tomis (modern-day Constanța) written in elegiac couplets and addressed to his wife and friends. The first three books were composed between 12–13 AD, according to the general academic consensus: "none of these elegies contains references to events falling outside that time span". The fourth book is believed to have been published posthumously.

The poems 

The themes of the letters are similar to those of Tristia. Ovid writes to his wife and friends about the grimness of his exile, his deteriorating state of health and the future of his literary works. The last surviving letter of the collection is addressed to an unnamed enemy. A recurring request to Ovid's named addressees in Epistulae ex Ponto remains his desire for a change of location from Tomis, which he repeatedly describes as "a town located in a war-stricken cultural wasteland on the remotest margins of empire". Recent scholarship has repeatedly identified discrepancies between Ovid's version and historical fact regarding Tomis.

While they explore similar themes, Epistulae ex Ponto differ from Tristia in epistolographic format, as they have named addressees. The individuals named include Paullus Fabius Maximus, Sextus Pompeius, and the brothers Marcus Valerius Messalla Messallinus and Marcus Aurelius Cotta Maximus Messalinus. Ovid's hopes rested largely on the genial character of Germanicus, nephew and adopted son of the emperor Tiberius, who is addressed or mentioned in several places. 

Augustus and Livia feature heavily in the collection, as they do in Tristia, as absolute authorities over Ovid's hopes of his recalling to Rome or change of location for his relegation. Ovid acknowledges the Empress Livia as a potential ally to return home, describing her like a vestal virgin – "pudicarum Vesta matrum", "Vesta of chaste matrons". However, Augustus' death and the death of his friend and frequent addressee, Paullus Fabius Maximus, discourage Ovid from hoping for a return. The collection ends on a sombre note, with a letter addressed to an unnamed enemy, accused of attempting to harm an already ruined Ovid.

Structure
Epistulae ex Ponto is divided in four books, all consisting of letters sent to different addressees. 

 Book I: letters to Brutus, Paullus Fabius Maximus, Rufinus, his wife, Cotta Maximus Messalinus, Publius Pomponius Graecinus, Messalinus, Severus, Flaccus. 
 Book II: letters to Germanicus, Messalinus, Cotta Maximus Messalinus, Atticus, Salanus, Publius Pomponius Graecinus, Cotys of Thrace, Macer and Rufus.
 Book III: letters to his wife, Cotta Maximus Messalinus, Paullus Fabius Maximus, Rufinus, an unknown friend and a group of unknown friends. 
 Book IV: letters to Sextus Pompeius, Cornelius Severus, Brutus, Vestalis, Suillius, Graecinus, Albinovanus, Gallio, Carus, Tuticanus and an unnamed enemy.

References

1st-century Latin books
Poetry by Ovid
Moesia
Ancient history of Romania
Collections of letters
Works about exile